Darryl Fitzgerald (born 1990) is a New Zealand canoeist.

Darryl Fitzgerald may also refer to:

Darryl Fitzgerald, character in Almost Summer
Darryl Fitzgerald, character in Terri (film)